Ilaria Sanguineti (born 15 April 1994) is an Italian professional racing cyclist, who currently rides for UCI Women's Continental Team .

Major results

2012
 2nd Time trial, National Junior Road Championships
2015
 1st Overall Tour de Bretagne Féminin
1st Young rider classification
1st Stage 1
 2nd  Road race, UEC European Under-23 Road Championships
 7th Overall Tour of Zhoushan Island
2016
 1st Stage 4 Tour de Bretagne Féminin
 7th Gran Premio della Liberazione
 8th Grand Prix de Dottignies
2017
 1st Stage 1 (TTT) Setmana Ciclista Valenciana
 3rd Pajot Hills Classic
 4th Grand Prix de Dottignies
 5th Overall Tour of Zhoushan Island
 10th Gran Premio della Liberazione
2018
 1st  Points classification Madrid Challenge by La Vuelta
 4th Diamond Tour
 4th Erondegemse Pijl
 8th Tour of Guangxi Women's Elite World Challenge
2019
 3rd Road race, National Road Championships
 4th Trofee Maarten Wynants
 6th Gran Premio Bruno Beghelli Internazionale Donne Elite
 8th Tour of Guangxi Women's Elite World Challenge
2020
 9th Omloop van het Hageland
2021
 3rd Road race, National Road Championships
 8th Dwars door het Hageland
2022
 2nd Vuelta a la Comunitat Valenciana Feminas
 4rd Trofeo Oro in Euro–Women's Bike Race
 9th Gran Premio della Liberazione

See also
 List of 2015 UCI Women's Teams and riders

References

External links
 

1994 births
Living people
Italian female cyclists
People from Sanremo
Cyclists from Liguria
Sportspeople from the Province of Imperia